Juan Postigos (born 13 May 1989) is a Peruvian judoka who won a bronze medal at the 2011 Pan American Games. The same year he moved to France seeking better training conditions. He competed at the 2012 and 2016 Olympics, but was eliminated in his first match on both occasions. He was also eliminated in his first match in the men's 66 kg event at the 2020 Summer Olympics in Tokyo, Japan.

References

External links
 

Peruvian male judoka
1989 births
Living people
Sportspeople from Lima
Olympic judoka of Peru
Judoka at the 2012 Summer Olympics
Judoka at the 2016 Summer Olympics
Pan American Games bronze medalists for Peru
Pan American Games medalists in judo
Judoka at the 2015 Pan American Games
Medalists at the 2011 Pan American Games
Judoka at the 2020 Summer Olympics
20th-century Peruvian people
21st-century Peruvian people